Val Quentin is a summer village in Alberta, Canada. It is located on the southern shore of Lac Ste. Anne.

Demographics 

In the 2016 Census of Population conducted by Statistics Canada, the Summer Village of Val Quentin had a population of 252 living in 128 of its 224 total private dwellings, a  change from its 2011 population of 157.

See also 
List of communities in Alberta
List of summer villages in Alberta
List of resort villages in Saskatchewan

References

External links 

1966 establishments in Alberta
Lac Ste. Anne County
Summer villages in Alberta